Jean-Dimmy Jéoboam (born 23 September 1986) is a Haitian former professional footballer who played as a forward. Following a short stint with Stade Lavallois in Ligue 2 he spent most of his career in the lower leagues of France.

Career
In April 2009, Jéoboam played for the reserves of La Vitréenne in the French sixth tier.

In 2011, he played for CS Louhans-Cuiseaux in the fourth tier.

In July 2012, he joined FCM Aubervilliers, also in the fourth tier.

Post-playing career
Following his retirement as a player, Jéoboam gained a UEFA B coaching licence and became a coach. He coached the under-20 side Racing Club de France Football.

References

External links
 
 Profile at foot-national.com

1986 births
Living people
People from Ouest (department)
Haitian footballers
Association football forwards
Ligue 2 players
Championnat National players
Championnat National 2 players
Swiss Challenge League players
Stade Lavallois players
Paris FC players
La Vitréenne FC players
FC Fribourg players
Louhans-Cuiseaux FC players
FCM Aubervilliers players
Haitian expatriate footballers
Haitian expatriate sportspeople in France
Expatriate footballers in France
Haitian expatriate sportspeople in Switzerland
Expatriate footballers in Switzerland